Stamer is a surname. Notable people with the name include:

Henrik Stamer Hedin (born 1946),  Danish communist and translator, chairman of Communist Party of Denmark
Josh Stamer (born 1977), American football linebacker
Lovelace Stamer (1829–1908), Anglican Bishop of Shrewsbury
William Donovan Stamer (1895–1963), British army officer

See also
Stamer baronets, Baronetage of the United Kingdom
Stammer (disambiguation)
Stahmer
Starmer (surname)
Sthamer